Journey Escape is a video game developed and manufactured by Data Age in San Jose, California for the Atari 2600 console, and released in 1982. It stars the rock band Journey, one of the world's most popular acts at the time, and is based on their album Escape.

Plot
From the game's manual:

You're on the road with Journey, one of the world's hottest rock groups. A spectacular performance has just ended. Now it's up to you to guide each Journey Band Member past hordes of Love-Crazed Groupies, Sneaky Photographers, and Shifty-Eyed Promoters to the safety of the Journey Escape Vehicle in time to make the next concert. Your mighty manager and loyal roadies are there to help, but the escape is up to you!

Gameplay

The player must lead the band members to their "Scarab Escape Vehicle" (as featured on the cover) and protect the concert cash from "love-crazed" groupies, sneaky photographers, stage barriers and "shifty-eyed" promoters. Assisting the player are roadies, which provide short periods of immunity to obstacles, and The Manager, depicted as the Kool-Aid Man, which allows the player to move to the Scarab completely unhindered. The screen scrolls vertically non-stop, although the speed can be controlled; the player moves side to side to dodge the aforementioned obstacles.

Music
The intro tune is an excerpt from "Don't Stop Believin'," which is on the Escape album. The in-game music, however, appears to be an original tune, rather than based on a Journey song.

See also
 Journey, 1983 arcade game, also featuring the band
 Revolution X, 1994 video game featuring rock band Aerosmith

References

External links
 Complete manual transcript, with screenshots
 GameFAQs page of Journey Escape

1982 video games
Atari 2600 games
Atari 2600-only games
Journey (band)
Video games based on musicians
North America-exclusive video games
Band-centric video games
Video games developed in the United States